The Adamites, or Adamians, were adherents of an Early Christian group in North Africa in the 2nd, 3rd, and 4th centuries. They wore no clothing during their religious services. There were later reports of similar sects in Central Europe during the Late Middle Ages.

Ancient Adamites
The obscure sect, dating probably from the 2nd century, professed to have regained Adam and Eve's primeval innocence. Various accounts are given of their origin. Some have thought them to have been an offshoot of the Carpocratian Gnostics, who professed a sensual mysticism and a complete emancipation from the moral law. Theodoret (Haer. Fab., I, 6) held this view of them, and identified them with the licentious sects whose practices are described by Clement of Alexandria. Others, on the contrary, consider them to have been misguided ascetics, who strove to extirpate carnal desires by a return to simpler manners, and by the abolition of marriage.

St. Epiphanius and Augustine of Hippo mention the Adamites by name, and describe their practices. They called their church "Paradise", claiming that its members were re-established in Adam and Eve's state of original innocence. Accordingly, they practiced "holy nudism", rejected the concept of marriage as foreign to Eden, saying it would never have existed but for sin, and lived in absolute lawlessness, holding that, whatever they did, their actions could be neither good nor bad.

Neo-Adamites

Practices similar to those of the ancient Adamites appeared in Europe several times in later ages. During the Middle Ages the doctrines of this obscure sect, which did not itself exist long, were revived: in the 13th century in the Netherlands by the Brethren of the Free Spirit and the Taborites in Bohemia, and, in the 14th century, by some German Beghards. Everywhere they met with firm opposition from the mainstream churches.

The Taborite movement was started in 1419 in opposition to the authority of the Holy Roman Empire. One sect of Taborites, the  Bohemian Adamites, dissociated themselves from other Taborites and took up the practice of going naked through towns and villages. They preached that "God dwelt in the Saints of the Last Days" and considered exclusive marriage to be a sin. The historian Norman Cohn observed: "Whereas the Taborites were strictly monogamous, in this sect free love seems to have been the rule. The Adamites declared that the chaste were unworthy to enter the Messianic kingdom ... The sect was much given to ritual naked dances held around a fire. Indeed, these people seemed to have spent much of their time naked, ignoring the heat and cold and claiming to be in the state of innocence enjoined by Adam and Eve." Cohn also commented that the Adamites were criticised by other Taborites for "never thinking of earning their own living by the work of their hands".

The Beghards became the Picards of Bohemia, who took possession of an island in the river Nežárka, and lived communally, practicing social and religious nudity, free love and rejecting marriage and individual ownership of property. Jan Žižka, the Hussite leader, nearly exterminated the sect in 1421. In the following year, the sect was widely spread over Bohemia and Moravia, and especially hated by the Hussites (whom they resembled in hatred toward the hierarchy) because the Adamites rejected transubstantiation, the priesthood and the Supper. The strife between the Adamites and the Taborites is dramatized in Against All, the third part of Otakar Vávra's Hussite film trilogy (1958).

The splintering of Protestantism during the Wars of the Three Kingdoms in the 17th century saw Adamites recorded in the Catalogue of the Several Sects and Opinions in England.

See also
 Adamskostuum
 Anarchist naturism
 Christian naturism
 Freedomites
 Restorationism

References

Citations

Sources

External links

Christian organizations
Christian radicalism
Nudity in religion